The Sun's Tirade is the second studio album by American rapper Isaiah Rashad. It was released on September 2, 2016, and is his second release with Top Dawg Entertainment, following 2014's acclaimed Cilvia Demo.

The album, recorded during a period in which Rashad experienced struggles with depression and addiction, features a strongly reflective and conscious tone with production that takes influence from hip hop, trap, trip hop, soul, and jazz. It features guest appearances from SiR, Zacari, Kendrick Lamar, Deacon Blues, Kari Faux, Syd tha Kyd, Hugh Augustine, Jay Rock and SZA. The album's production was handled by several producers, including Mike Will Made It, D. Sanders, Cam O'bi, J. LBS, The Antydote and Chris Calor.

The Sun's Tirade was met with critical acclaim from music critics, and appeared on numerous end-of-year best album lists from various publications. The album debuted at number 17 on the US Billboard 200, selling 19,000 copies its first week. The album was supported by the critically acclaimed lead single, "Free Lunch".

Background and promotion

On August 26, 2016, Isaiah Rashad announced the album's title, release date and the reveal of the artwork. On August 30, he shared the album's track listing, which features guest appearances from Kari Faux, Syd and SiR, along with Top Dawg label-mates such as SZA, Jay Rock and Kendrick Lamar. Rashad released The Sun's Tirade on September 2, 2016.

During various interviews in promotion of the album, Rashad revealed that he was addicted to Xanax and alcohol, and was suffering from depression, anxiety and isolation during the time between the release of Cilvia Demo and The Sun's Tirade. He further stated that he "fucked up", and almost got dropped from Top Dawg Entertainment a total of three times during the recording of his album.

{{quote box|quoted = 1|quote=I just want them [fans] to enjoy themselves listening to this project. I hope this make it easier for them to approach me, make you feel like you're talking to a regular person. As far as learning about me, I don’t know. You'll learn I got range. I got some more range that you didn't think I had. I want people to be like, "Damn, this nigga can do this?" Because that motivates me a lot.|source=—Isaiah Rashad, via XXL|width=22%|align=right|style=padding:8px;|border=2px}}

"Free Lunch" was released as the album's lead single on August 7, 2016. The music video for the single, directed by APLUS Filmz, was uploaded to Top Dawg Entertainment's YouTube channel on August 10.

On August 27, 2016, Rashad performed "Free Lunch" with Kendrick Lamar during Lamar's headlining set at FYF Fest. On September 17, 2016, he performed "Tity and Dolla" at the BET Hip Hop Awards, which aired in the next month. Rashad also released music videos for the songs "4r da Squaw" and "Park", which have not been released as singles.

 Music and lyrics The Sun's Tirade, much like its predecessor, is a loose concept album. The project is characterized by its personal themes, such as substance abuse, depression, and Rashad's personal struggles with alcohol and Xanax addiction. The album incorporates stylistic and production elements of southern hip hop, jazz, neo soul, trap music, and progressive hip hop. Musically, the project has been noted by publications for its diversity and unique sonic palate, and for being "much more jazzy and upbeat" than Cilvia Demo. Rashad's vocals are layered and textured. His voice throughout the record displays a "heavy rasp" and "sing-songy flow".

Critical reception The Sun's Tirade received positive reviews from music critics upon its release. At Metacritic, which assigns a normalized rating out of 100 to reviews from critics, the album received an average score of 80, which indicates "generally positive reviews," based on 11 reviews. Sheldon Pearce of Pitchfork Media praised The Sun's Tirade, dubbing the album "a complex portrait of a man in transition", and further applauded Rashad for "wear[ing] his anxieties" on his sleeve. Ryan Lunn of The Line of Best Fit lauded the album, saying "while the album may have been crafted during a two-year tsunami of struggle, Isaiah Rashad still manages to sound as calm as an ocean’s gentle waves; sounding so effortless has never taken so much effort." Andy Kellman of Allmusic similarly praised the album, citing its creativity and production as a highlight, while also directing praise at Rashad's rapping, stating "Rashad's voice is dispirited, on the brink of disintegration".

Stephen Kearse of Consequence of Sound reviewed the album favorably, noting the album's "experimental aesthetic" as more refined than on Rashad's previous efforts. In a less positive review, Michael G. Barilleaux of No Ripcord found the album to be boring, stating "Each song on this album makes its own point, but does it in exactly the same tone as the last. The end result is 17 tracks of one sound in a row, all bleeding into each other."

AccoladesThe Sun's Tirade'' appeared on numerous end-of-year best album lists from various publications.

Commercial performance
The album debuted at number 17 on the US Billboard 200, selling 19,000 copies its first week.

Track listing
All tracks written by Isaiah McClain, unless otherwise denoted

Charts

References

2016 debut albums
Isaiah Rashad albums
Top Dawg Entertainment albums
Albums produced by Mike Will Made It
Albums produced by Steve Lacy
Albums produced by Dave Free
Albums produced by Frank Dukes